Daddies is a brand of ketchup and brown sauce in the United Kingdom.

History
The brown sauce product, known as "Daddies Sauce", was launched in 1904, and the ketchup was launched in 1930. The brand is owned by the H. J. Heinz Company; it was bought as part of the acquisition of HP Foods from previous owner Groupe Danone in 2005. Production of Daddies was moved to Poland.

In 1899, Edwin Samson Moore, the owner of the Midland Vinegar Company in Aston Cross, Birmingham went to see one of his customers who owed him a debt for vinegar. The man was Frederick Gibson Garton, a Nottingham grocer who had a small sauce factory at the rear of his premises. The 2013 book HP Sauce My Ancestors' Legacy tells the story of how Moore saw a sauce brewing in the back copper while visiting Garton. Garton explained it was his new sauce called Daddies Sauce. Moore cancelled the debt and paid Garton £150 (around £ in today's money) for the recipe of his sauces and chutneys which included Daddies Sauce and HP Sauce.

Marketplace competition
Heinz and Daddies are apparent competitors in the UK marketplace, with strong regional popularity in The Midlands, Wales, and The West Country. Daddies Ketchup trails the dominant market leader, the better-known Heinz Tomato Ketchup..  Similarly, Daddies Sauce and HP Sauce are apparent competitors in the brown sauce market.

See also

 List of sauces

References

Products introduced in 1909
Brand name condiments
British condiments
Brown sauces
Heinz brands